Navin Nischol (18 March 1946 – 19 March 2011) was an Indian actor. He made his debut with the Hindi film Sawan Bhadon in 1970. In 1996 he worked in Pyar Zindagi Hai along with Rita Bhaduri and Raj Mohammed. The film was shot in Hyderabad.

Early life
Navin Nischol studied in Bangalore Military School, Bangalore, erstwhile King George Royal India Military College, Bangalore. He was the first gold medalist from the Film and Television Institute of India to make it big. He starred in several superhit movies such as Victoria No. 203 (1972),  Dhund (1973) and Aashiq Banaya Aapne (2005). Hanste Zakhm was the great breakthrough of his career. Later on, Nischol switched to character roles and carved out a successful career for himself on television. One of his most successful serials on television was Dekh Bhai Dekh, co-starring Sushma Seth, Shekhar Suman and Farida Jalal. He also starred in the Punjabi films Aasra Pyar Da (1983) and Mahaul Theek Hai (1999).

Personal life
Navin's first marriage was to Dev Anand's niece Neelu Kapur, sister of Shekhar Kapur.

Navin later married divorcee Geetanjali. On 24 April 2006, Geetanjali hanged herself at her residence. She blamed Navin and his brother Pravin for her suicide. Nischol died of a heart attack on 19 March 2011 en route from Mumbai to Pune. He was 65 years old. Naveen had two Daughters named as Natasha and Nomita from his first marriage.

Bollywood reaction to death
Rishi Kapoor, Bollywood actor, said "I had directed Navin in Aa Ab Laut Chalein. A good looking man and a good human being. Very cultured and a great conversationalist. I bumped into him after ages at the Otters Club on Friday night. I don't frequent Otters Club. So in hindsight it all seems providential. The next morning he was supposed to drive with producer Gawa (Gurdeep Singh) and my brother Daboo (Randhir Kapoor) to Pune to spend a quiet Holi there. But before Gawa and Navin could reach Daboo, Navin asked Gawa to lower AC in the car. Then he just slumped and died... Just like that! It's too shocking and sad."

Vipul Shah, Bollywood director, said "He was a regular at my dear friend Manmohan Shetty's parties. A really soft spoken and cultured man. It is sad that his career didn't take off again after Khosla Ka Ghosla."

Dibakar Banerjee, who directed Navin Nischol in Khosla Ka Ghosla, said: "He was an effortless actor, superb technically. He had a pickled sense of humour. He had been through all the turns of life that an actor could possibly experience. My misfortune that I couldn't work with him again. I dearly wanted to."

Kunal Kohli, producer of Nitin's film Break Ke Baad, recalls, "He was a thorough gentleman. A very warm person. I had wonderful conversations with him. He shared stories of past films and filmmakers with me. I'd just listen to him as enraptured as a child hearing fairy tales. In the evening of his life he wanted to share his experiences. I feel privileged I spent evenings hearing him talk about the past. I think I'm a richer human being because of those evenings with Navinji."

Shabana Azmi, Bollywood actress, said "I remember Navin fondly. He was an underrated actor who had a very good voice and flawless diction both of which are rare. His performance in Lekh Tandon's Ek Baar Kaho is gentle, sophisticated and memorable. He used to often reminisce about his overnight stardom and the cruelty with which it was snatched away. It made him sometimes bitter, sometimes philosophical but he came to terms with it and moved on. His performance in Nagesh Kukoonoor's film Bollywood Calling as an aging film star was very moving. My condolences to the family."

Filmography

TV Series

 Rishte-Naate (1980)
 Dekh Bhai Dekh (1993)
 Aahat (1995) (Season1) (1995-2001) Episode 62/63 -The Noose 1episode only
 Daal Mein Kala (1998)
 Waqt Ki Raftaar (1998-1999)
 Farman
 Aashirwad  (1998-2001)
Choodiyan(2000)
Kehta Hai Dil (2001-2002)
 Apna Apna Style

References

External links

1946 births
2011 deaths
Indian male film actors
Male actors in Hindi cinema
Indian male television actors
Film and Television Institute of India alumni
People from Lahore